Erzya or Erzia may refer to:
Erzya language, a Uralic language spoken in Russia
Erzya literature, literature written in the Erzya language
Erzyan Mastor, a splinter group from the Mastorava religion
Erzyan Mastor (journal), an Erzyan- and Russian-language bilingual newspaper
Erzya people
Stepan Erzia (1876–1959), Mordvin sculptor who lived in Russia

See also
Erza (disambiguation)